S. Sivaraman is an Indian politician and former Member of the Legislative Assembly of Tamil Nadu. He was elected to the Tamil Nadu legislative assembly as an Indian National Congress (Indira) candidate from Chinnasalem constituency in 1980 election and as an Independent candidate in 1984 election.

References 

Indian National Congress politicians from Tamil Nadu
Possibly living people
Year of birth missing
Tamil Nadu MLAs 1985–1989